The Quarterly Journal of Austrian Economics is a quarterly peer-reviewed academic journal covering heterodox economics published by the Ludwig von Mises Institute. It was established in 1998 after the Murray Rothbard-created publication, The Review of Austrian Economics, was transferred to other editors and then to George Mason University. The journal covers economics from an Austrian School perspective. The current editor-in-chief is Joseph Salerno.

A 2010 study identified 62 regularly published heterodox journals and used various empirical criteria to compare several aspects of their research quality. The Quarterly Journals Bibliographic Ranking was ranked 33rd out of the 62 heterodox economics journals surveyed; its reputation among peers (both mainstream and heterodox) was ranked 57th.

References

External links
 

Economics journals
Quarterly journals
Libertarian publications
Austrian School periodicals
Publications established in 1987
English-language journals
Mises Institute